Elioro Manuel Paredes Anarizia (born 19 February 1921, date of death unknown) was a Paraguayan football defender who played for Paraguay in the 1950 FIFA World Cup. He also played for Club Sportivo Luqueño. Paredes is deceased.

References

External links
FIFA profile

1921 births
Year of death missing
Paraguayan footballers
Paraguay international footballers
Sportivo Luqueño players
1950 FIFA World Cup players